The 2000 Tenneco Automotive Grand Prix of Detroit was a Championship Auto Racing Teams (CART) race that was held on June 18, 2000 on the Raceway on Belle Isle in Detroit, Michigan. It was the seventh race of the 2000 CART season. The race was won by Hélio Castroneves for Team Penske. Max Papis finished second, and Oriol Servià clinched third.

Preparations for the race were overshadowed by the news that CART CEO Andrew Craig had been voted out from his position, and his duties had been temporarily taken on by Bobby Rahal. Juan Pablo Montoya claimed pole position for the race, and led the first 58 laps of the race before he briefly relinquished the lead to Roberto Moreno when he made a pit stop. He regained first position a lap later, but only led for one more lap before he slowed down, and eventually cruised into the pit lane, and retired with a broken drive shaft. Castroneves took over the lead, and remained at the front for the rest of the race. To celebrate his win, Castroneves parked his car on the track, leapt out and climbed the fence, shaking it in jubilation. It was the first win that Castroneves, or any other racing driver, celebrated in this fashion, and he has since repeated the celebration for each of his victories, and it has also been mimicked by other drivers.

There were three cautions, totalling 10 laps during the race. It was Castroneves's first victory of his CART career, and he was the seventh different winner in the first seven races of the 2000 season. Of the 24 drivers that started, 14 were listed as running at the end of the race; four retired after contact, five retired with mechanical issues, and Paul Tracy was disqualified after he hit a crew member during service on pit lane.

Classification

Race results

Standings after the race

Drivers' Championship

Constructors' standings

Manufacturer's Standings

References

Detroit Grand Prix
Detroit Pistons Michigan
Detroit Indy Grand Prix
2000 in Detroit